The 1909 North Carolina Tar Heels football team represented the University of North Carolina in the 1909 college football season. The team captain of the 1909 season was C.C. Garrett.

Schedule

References

North Carolina
North Carolina Tar Heels football seasons
North Carolina Tar Heels football